The 2008 Arizona Republican presidential primary took place on February 5, 2008, with 50 national delegates.

Results

Note: * Includes 3 unpledged Republican National Committee delegates

See also
 2008 Arizona Democratic primary
 2008 Republican Party presidential primaries

References

Arizona
2008 Arizona elections
2008 Super Tuesday
Arizona Republican primaries